William Butler may refer to:

Actors
 William Butler (actor), U.S. actor, played in Leatherface: The Texas Chainsaw Massacre III
 William J. Butler (1860–1927), Irish silent film actor

Law
 William Allen Butler (1825–1902), American lawyer and writer of poetical satires
 William E. Butler (born 1939), American-British legal scholar
 William Butler (judge) (1822–1909), U.S. federal judge

Military
 William Butler (colonel) (died 1789), American Revolutionary War soldier from Pennsylvania, one of five Butler brothers in the war
 William Butler (1759–1821), American Revolutionary War soldier, 1790s militia general, U.S. Representative from South Carolina
 William Butler (militiaman) (1759–1818), U.S. militia captain killed in the Creek War, namesake of Butler County, Alabama
 William Orlando Butler (1791–1880), U.S. soldier in the War of 1812 and Mexican–American War, 1848 Democratic vice-presidential candidate
 Sir William Butler (British Army officer) (1838–1910), 19th century British Army lieutenant general and adventurer
 William Boynton Butler (1894–1972), British Army soldier awarded a Victoria Cross

Music
 William Butler (musician) (born 1982), American musician, member of the Arcade Fire
 William Butler (sound designer), British/Canadian musician, sound designer and recording engineer

Politics
 William Butler (fl. 1386–1393), Member of Parliament (MP) for Nottingham
 William Butler (1544–1577), MP for Queenborough
 William Boteler (died 1602) (1540–1602), or Butler, MP for Lyme Regis and Bedford
 William Butler (1790–1850), U.S. Representative from South Carolina
 William Butler (fl. 1859–1863), Illinois State Treasurer
 William M. Butler (1861–1937), lawyer and legislator for the state of Massachusetts, United States Senator
 William Henry Butler (1790–1865), English wine merchant and Mayor of Oxford
 William Butler (New Zealand politician) (1841–1875), New Zealand politician

Religion
 William Butler (missionary) (1818–1899), Irish-born U.S. Methodist Episcopal missionary to Mexico and India
 William John Butler (1818–1894), High Church Anglican priest
 William Butler (canon) (died 1519), Canon of Windsor

Sports
 William C. Butler (1844–1914), played football for England
 William Butler (cricketer) (1871–1953), New Zealand first-class cricketer, later international Test cricket umpire
 William Butler (footballer) (1872–1953), Druids F.C. and Wales international footballer

Others
 William Butler (physician) (1535–1617), Fellow of Clare College, Cambridge
 William F. Butler, African American leader after the American Civil War
 William Archer Butler (1814–1848), Irish historian of philosophy
 William Butler (brewer), whose company was merged into Mitchells & Butlers
 William Butler (author), author of the novel The Butterfly Revolution
 William Butler (alchemist) (c. 1534–1617), Irish alchemist
 William James Butler (1858–1932), New Zealand sawmiller and timber merchant

See also
 William Butler Yeats, Irish poet
 Bill Butler (disambiguation)
 Billy Butler (disambiguation)
 William Boteler (disambiguation), spellings often used interchangeably